Adrian Bartkowiak (born January 28, 1987) is a Polish retired footballer who played as a defender.

Career
In January 2011, he was loaned to Warta Poznań on a half year deal. He returned to Górnik Łęczna half a year later.

Honours
Dyskobolia Grodzisk Wlkp.
Ekstraklasa Cup: 2007

References

External links
 

1987 births
Living people
Footballers from Poznań
Polish footballers
Lech Poznań II players
Lech Poznań players
Dyskobolia Grodzisk Wielkopolski players
Stal Stalowa Wola players
Górnik Łęczna players
Warta Poznań players
Ekstraklasa players
I liga players
II liga players
Association football defenders